Schenella romana is a species of earthstar found in Italy.

References

Geastraceae